Keith P. Ellison (born April 29, 1950) is a United States district judge of the United States District Court for the Southern District of Texas. His chambers are in Houston, Texas.

Education

Born in 1950 in New Orleans, Louisiana, Ellison was educated first at Harvard College, from which he received a Bachelor of Arts degree from Harvard University in 1972. He was awarded a Rhodes scholarship to Oxford where he studied at Magdalen College, receiving a second Bachelor of Arts degree in 1974. He received his Juris Doctor from Yale Law School in 1976.

Career

After graduating from Yale, he clerked for Judge J. Skelly Wright of the United States Court of Appeals for the District of Columbia Circuit. He then clerked for Justice Harry Blackmun of the Supreme Court during the October 1977 term, before entering private practice in Houston, Texas.

Federal judicial service

On January 26, 1999, Ellison was nominated by President Bill Clinton to a seat on the United States District Court for the Southern District of Texas vacated by Norman William Black. Ellison was confirmed by the United States Senate on June 30, 1999, and received his commission on July 7, 1999. His chambers were in Laredo, until 2005 when his duty station transferred to Houston.

See also 
List of law clerks of the Supreme Court of the United States (Seat 2)

References

Sources

1950 births
Living people
American Rhodes Scholars
Harvard College alumni
Alumni of Magdalen College, Oxford
Yale Law School alumni
Law clerks of the Supreme Court of the United States
Judges of the United States District Court for the Southern District of Texas
United States district court judges appointed by Bill Clinton
Lawyers from New Orleans
20th-century American judges
Lawyers from Houston
21st-century American judges